You Belong is an EP released by American rock band, After Midnight Project.  It was released on April 1, 2011.

The first single "Hourglass" was first released on KROQ-FM on February 27, 2011.

Track list
"You Belong" (1:04)
"Fire in the Sky" (3:04)
"Let Go" (3:26)
"Hourglass"(3:13)
"Keep My Feet on the Ground" (3:47)
"Open Door"(2:03)
"Beautiful World" (3:29)
"The Otherside" (3:17)

Personnel
 Jason Evigan - vocals, programming, guitar
 Spencer Bastian - guitar
 Ryan Folden - drums
 Christian Meadows - guitar

References

2011 EPs
After Midnight Project albums